Dontok Monastery is a Buddhist monastery south of Ganzi, Sichuan, China.

References

Buddhist monasteries in Sichuan
Tibetan Buddhist monasteries